Sherrelwood is an unincorporated community and a census-designated place (CDP) located in and governed by Adams County, Colorado, United States. The CDP is a part of the Denver–Aurora–Lakewood, CO Metropolitan Statistical Area. The population of the Sherrelwood CDP was 18,287 at the United States Census 2010. Denver post office 80221 serves the area.

Geography

Demographics

Education
Sherrelwood is served by the Westminster Public Schools.
Sherrelwood Elementary School

See also

Outline of Colorado
Index of Colorado-related articles
State of Colorado
Colorado cities and towns
Colorado census designated places
Colorado counties
Adams County, Colorado
List of statistical areas in Colorado
Front Range Urban Corridor
North Central Colorado Urban Area
Denver-Aurora-Boulder, CO Combined Statistical Area
Denver-Aurora-Broomfield, CO Metropolitan Statistical Area

References

External links

Sherrelwood Community
Westminster Public Schools
Sherrelwood Elementary School
Adams County website

Census-designated places in Adams County, Colorado
Census-designated places in Colorado
Denver metropolitan area